Bektashabad (also Romanized as Bektāshābād) is a village in Miyan Darband Rural District, in the Central District of Kermanshah County, Kermanshah Province, Iran. At the 2006 census, its population was 220, in 47 families.

References 

Populated places in Kermanshah County